Oniipa is a town in the Oshikoto Region of northern Namibia and the district capital of the Oniipa electoral constituency. It lies just outside Ondangwa. It is the hometown of former Lutheran bishop and liberation leader Leonard Auala.

There is also the well-known old church hospital called Onandjokwe Lutheran Hospital, which was named after the first female nurse.  Oniipa is also known with the history during the struggle of independence of this country, as the best-known printing shop was burnt down by the Boers. The Oniipa Training School is located in town.

Politics

Oniipa is governed by a town council that has seven seats.

Oshikoto Region, to which Oniipa belongs, is a stronghold of Namibia's ruling SWAPO party. For the 2015 local authority election no opposition party nominated a candidate, and SWAPO won uncontested. SWAPO only narrowly won the 2020 local authority election. It obtained 733 votes and gained four seats. The Independent Patriots for Change (IPC), an opposition party formed in August 2020, obtained 673 votes and gained three seats.

References 

Towns in Namibia
Finnish Evangelical Lutheran Mission mission stations in Ondonga
Populated places in the Oshikoto Region